Mihu Dragomir (pen name of Mihail C. Dragomirescu; April 24, 1919 – April 9, 1964) was a Romanian poet, prose writer and translator.

Born in Brăila, his parents were Constantin Dragomirescu and his wife Octavia-Olimpia (née Rădulescu), both teachers. He attended primary school in his native city, followed by Nicolae Bălcescu High School from 1929 to 1933. In 1933, he studied at Bucharest's Gheorghe Șincai High School, returning to Brăila for the Commercial High School from 1934 to 1936. Expelled for a "nihilist" attitude, he re-enrolled in autumn 1936, and graduated at the top of his class in 1939. The same year, he entered the Bucharest Commercial Academy, but interrupted in order to attend the Bacău reserve officers' school from 1940 to 1941. He resumed university classes in 1942, but was mobilized in 1943 and saw action in World War II until 1945. He then continued his studies, with interruptions, until graduating in 1948.

His first newspaper article appeared in Revista tineretului creștin in 1933; other contributions followed in the crossword puzzle magazines Revista jocurilor, Rebus and Curentul jocurilor, where he used the pen names Jules Limah, Dr. M. C., Mihail, Mișu Brăilițeanu and M. C. Dragomirescu. His first poems appeared in print in 1936, in the Silistra Valuri dunărene; that year, he self-published his first book of poems, Gânduri prăfuite, in 200 copies. He founded Flamura magazine in Brăila in 1937. He published the short poetry collections Rugă de ateu, adică vorbe despre orânduieli și cârmuitori (1938) and Înger condeier (1939), as well as the poem Edgar Allan Poe (1940). Magazines that published his work include Universul literar, Prepoem, Viață și suflet, Năzuința, Festival Adonis, Junimea dobrogeană, Luceafărul, Raza literară, Cadran, Revista Fundațiilor Regale, Păcală and Epigrama. He first used the pen name Mihu Dragomir in Flamura in 1938. In humorous magazines, he signed as Miguel Y Caramba.

From 1945 to 1946, he was cultural officer in the Romanian Communist Party-affiliated Organization of Progressive Youth. He was an editor at the Brăila newspaper Înainte from 1946 to 1948, and at Viața Românească from 1948 to 1954, in the early years of the communist regime. From 1954 to 1956, he was editor-in-chief of Tânărul scriitor; worked as editor-in-chief at the script-writing section of the Bucharest Cinematographic Center from 1956 to 1958; and was editor-in-chief of Luceafărul from 1958 to 1960. Starting in 1946 and until his death, he was a practitioner of socialist realism. The poetry books he published during the 1950s were Prima șarjă (1950), Stelele păcii (1952), Războiul (1954), Pe struna fulgerelor (1955), Odă pământului meu (1957) and Întoarcerea armelor (1959); he also authored the 1962 prose volume Povestiri deocamdată fantastice. Dragomir wrote translations of Edgar Allan Poe, Konstantin Simonov, Alexey Surkov, Alexander Yashin, H. G. Wells, John Steinbeck and Lope de Vega. He died in Giurgiu.

Notes

References
 Adriana Catrina (Lătărețu), "Contribuția lui Mihu Dragomir la dezvoltarea liricii realist-socialiste", in Buletin științific, Fascicula Filologie, Seria A, vol. XXII/2013, p. 139-47

1919 births
1964 deaths
People from Brăila
Bucharest Academy of Economic Studies alumni
Romanian military personnel of World War II
Romanian male poets
Romanian male short story writers
Romanian short story writers
Romanian science fiction writers
Romanian translators
Translators of Edgar Allan Poe
Romanian magazine founders
Romanian magazine editors
Romanian newspaper editors
Socialist realism writers
20th-century Romanian poets
20th-century translators
20th-century short story writers